Melody of Hate (German: Haß ohne Gnade) is a 1962 West German thriller film directed by Ralph Lothar and starring Maria Perschy, Horst Frank and Dietmar Schönherr.

Cast
 Maria Perschy as Claudia / Martina 
 Horst Frank as Rasan 
 Dietmar Schönherr as Dr. Elmer 
 Dorothee Parker as Sybille 
 Otto Storr as Leitender Professor des Sanatoriums

References

Bibliography 
 Bock, Hans-Michael & Bergfelder, Tim. The Concise CineGraph. Encyclopedia of German Cinema. Berghahn Books, 2009.

External links 
 

1962 films
1960s thriller films
German thriller films
West German films
1960s German-language films
Films directed by Ralph Lothar
1960s German films